Brett Borgen (7 November 1934 – 11 March 2014) was a Norwegian writer.

Borgen was born in Oslo as a daughter of Annemarta and Johan Borgen. She made her debut with Fra en ikke helt vellykket skuespillerinnes dagbok in 1972, and is also remembered for Istedenfor Lisbeth, Dualoger med Vår Herre and Isabella, sorgen og Don Juan in 1977, En time med Jesus (1978), Den fortapte datter (1979), Heltinnen (1981) and the memoirs Lillelord og Lady Brett (1985).

References

1934 births
2014 deaths
Writers from Oslo
Norwegian women short story writers
Norwegian women poets
Norwegian memoirists
Norwegian women novelists
20th-century Norwegian poets
20th-century Norwegian novelists
20th-century Norwegian women writers
20th-century Norwegian short story writers
Women memoirists